Agdistis arabica is a moth in the family Pterophoridae. It is known from Israel, Iran, Pakistan, Bahrain, Saudi Arabia, Yemen, Oman, Somalia, Sudan, Tunisia, Egypt and Pakistan.

References

Agdistinae
Moths of the Middle East
Fauna of Somalia
Moths of the Arabian Peninsula
Moths of Africa
Moths described in 1958